Prof Udaya Ranawaka (also known as Udaya K. Ranawaka) is a Senior Consultant Neurologist to the North Colombo Teaching Hospital(NCTH), Ragama and Senior Lecturer at the Faculty of Medicine, University of Kelaniya,

Early life and education
Ranawaka was educated at Nalanda College, Colombo.

He holds MBBS, from North Colombo Medical College, Doctor of Medicine, MRCP, FRCP London, Fellow of American Academy of Neurology, Fellow of American Heart Association.

Other positions
Ranawaka is the President of Ceylon College of Physicians.

Ranawaka is the President of the National Stroke Association of Sri Lanka (NSASL), an Honorary Secretary for The Sri Lanka Clinical Trials Registry (SLCTR) and a former President of National Stroke Association Sri Lanka.

References 

 

 

 

 

 

 

 

 

 

 

Sinhalese physicians
Alumni of Nalanda College, Colombo
Sri Lankan Buddhists
Fellows of the Royal College of Physicians